Mani or Maney  is a common proper name in the Middle East and South Asia. In Persian, Mani (مانی) means "eternity", "thinker", and "thoughtful". It is most common in Iran, Pakistan, Nepal, and India.  There are also a number of unrelated names also spelled Mani, some of them hypocoristic, such as German Mani for Manfred.

List of persons with the given name

Bhai Mani Singh (Sikh scholar and martyr) (born 7 April 1644), 
Mani (prophet) (c. 216 – 276), Iranian prophet
Mani (musician) (born 1962), English rock musician
Mani Ram Bagri (1920–2012), politician from India
Mani Madhava Chakyar (1899–1990), Indian master performance artist and Sanskrit scholar
Mani Charenamei (born 1959), Indian politician
Mani Damodara Chakyar (born 1946), Indian performance artist
Mani Cooper (born 2003), British ski jumper
Mani Haghighi (born 1969), Iranian filmmaker, screenwriter and actor
Mani Hoffman (born 1975), French singer, songwriter and music producer
Mani Jegathesan, Malaysian athlete
Mani Kaul (1944–2011), Indian film director
Mani Lama, Nepalese politician
Mani Leib (1883–1953), Ukrainian Yiddish poet
Mani Liaqat (born 1984), British actor and comedian
Mani Matter (1936–1972), Swiss singer-songwriter
Mani Menon (born 1948), Indian-American surgeon
Mani Nagappa (born 1925), Indian sculptor
Mani Neumeier (born 1940), German rock musician
Mani Nouri  (born 1989), Iranian-Canadian film director, writer, and actor
Mani Prasad (born 1930), Indian vocalist
Mani Rao (born 1965), Indian poet and translator
Mani Sharma (born 1964), Indian music director
Mani Ratnam (born 1956), Indian Tamil film director, producer, and writer
Mani Bai (1573 — 1619), Mughal Empress consort

List of persons with the surname
Alain Mamou-Mani (born 1949), French  film producer and writer
Arthur Mamou-Mani (born 1983), French architect 
Babu Mani, Indian footballer
Charulatha Mani (born 1981), Indian singer
Ehsan Mani (born 1945), Pakistani cricket player and official
G. K. Mani, Indian politician
Guy Mamou-Mani, French columnist  
Giuseppe Mani (born 1936), Italian archbishop
Hadizatou Mani, Nigerien human rights activist
Jose K. Mani, Indian politician
K. C. S. Mani (1922–1987), Indian communist activist
K. M. Mani (1933 - 2019), Indian politician
Karaikudi Mani (born 1945), Indian percussionist
Kalabhavan Mani (1971 - 2016), Indian actor and singer
Ko. Si. Mani (1929–2008), Indian politician
Mahadeva Subramania Mani (1908–2003), Indian entomologist
Myriam Léonie Mani (born 1977), Cameroonian athlete
Pravin Mani, Indian musician
Sapol Mani (born 1991), Togolese footballer
Vettam Mani (1921–1987), Indian scholar and writer
V. S. Mani, Indian legal scholar

See also
 Mani (disambiguation)

References